Mark Drela (July 1, 1959) is an American aeronautical engineer, currently the Professor of Fluid Dynamics at the Massachusetts Institute of Technology and an Elected Fellow of the American Institute of Aeronautics and Astronautics. He is primarily concerned with computational engineering, design, and optimization. Drela is famed for his work on aerodynamics softwares:
 XFOIL for airfoil analysis using a panel method
 Athena Vortex Lattice (AVL) for flight dynamic analysis using a vortex lattice method
 MISES for design and analysis of turbo machinery blading

In 2009, Drela was elected as a member into the National Academy of Engineering for creation of breakthrough aircraft designs and design software that enabled operation in new flight regimes.

References

Year of birth missing (living people)
Living people
MIT School of Engineering faculty
21st-century American physicists